El comisario is a Spanish police drama television series that originally aired for twelve seasons from 1999 to 2009 on Telecinco.  Produced by BocaBoca and Estudios Picasso and starring an ensemble cast with the likes of Tito Valverde, Juanjo Artero, Elena Irureta, Marcial Álvarez, Jaime Pujol, Cristina Perales and Fernando Andina, among others, the plot tracks the daily life the members of the Cuerpo Nacional de Policía at the police station of San Fernando in Madrid.

Premise 
The fiction, a police drama, is set in the 'San Fernando' police station, in the fictional district of the same name in Madrid. It deals with the daily life of the Cuerpo Nacional de Policía agents working in the station.

Gerardo Castilla serves as a cold but respectful Chief Police officer for the entire series. Recurring personal subplots include the friendship between Pope and Charlie, and the up and downs of the relationship between Charlie and Elo.

Cast

Final cast

Departed cast

Production and release 
Produced by BocaBoca and Estudios Picasso, the series was known as 'Las calles de San Fernando' prior to its release. The producers initially envisioned a dramedy, but the series was eventually re-written as a police drama. The series began airing on 26 April 1999. The series featured a 50 million peseta budget per episode, high for Spanish television at the time. The broadcasting run ended on 2 January 2009, after nearly 10 years on-air, 12 seasons and 191 episodes.

Tito Valverde and Juanjo Artero reprised their characters in El Príncipe in 2016, in guest appearances.

Episodes

References 
Citations

Bibliography
 
 

1990s police procedural television series
1990s Spanish drama television series
1999 Spanish television series debuts
2000s Spanish drama television series
2000s police procedural television series
2009 Spanish television series endings
Spanish-language television shows
Spanish police procedural television series
Telecinco network series
Television shows set in Madrid
Television series by BocaBoca